Chen Hongwei (born 23 November 1999) is a Chinese footballer currently playing as a central defender for Shaanxi Chang'an Athletic.

Career statistics

Club
.

References

1999 births
Living people
Chinese footballers
Association football defenders
China League One players
Liaoning F.C. players
Shaanxi Chang'an Athletic F.C. players
21st-century Chinese people